Baraeus vittatus is a species of beetle in the family Cerambycidae. It was described by Per Olof Christopher Aurivillius in 1913 and is known from the Democratic Republic of the Congo and Cameroon.

References

Pteropliini
Beetles described in 1913